This is a list of reality television series, by general type, listed with the date of their premiere. A few details are added for some shows that don't have their own article. See reality television for further descriptions.

Documentary style
In this genre, camera crews follow the daily interactions of people in ordinary places, such as airports or restaurants, or follow people in a specific profession.
 Up series (began with Seven Up! in 1964) (UK)
 Push Girls (2012)
 Curl Girls (2007)
 An American Family (1973)
 The Family (1974) (UK)
 Sightings (1991)
 The Real World (1992)
 Sylvania Waters (1992) (Australia)
 The Living Soap (1993) (UK)
 Road Rules (1994)
 Airport (1996) (UK; BBC)
 Airline (UK; ITV's imitation of Airport)
 Airline
 The Crocodile Hunter (1996)
 Driving School (1997) (UK; BBC)
 Bug Juice (1998)
 Emergency Vets (1998)
 True Life (1998)
 Gachinko! (ガチンコ!) (1999) (Japan)
 The Band-Josie 7 (2000) (Australia)
 Making the Band (2001)
 Project Greenlight (2001)
 Scariest Places on Earth (2001)
 U8TV: The Lofters (2001) (Canada; Life Network)
 Making the Band 2 (2002)
 The Salon (2002)
 Sorority Life (2002)
 American Chopper (2003)
 Fraternity Life (2003)
 Jamie's Kitchen (2003)
 The Restaurant (2003)
 Starting Over (2003)
Race to the Altar (2003)
 American Casino (2004)
 American Hot Rod (2004)
 Amish in the City (2004)
 Bands Reunited (2004)
 The Casino (2004)
 College Hill (2004)
 Family Plots (2004) (US; A&E Network)
 Ghost Hunters (2004)
 Laguna Beach: The Real Orange County (2004)
 Rachael Rocks (2004)
 Untold Stories of the E.R. (2004)
 Family Bonds (2004–2005)
 Deadliest Catch (2005)
 Miami Ink (2005)
 Stranded with Cash Peters (2005)
 Who's Your Daddy? (2005)
 8th & Ocean (2006)
 Bonds on Bonds (2006) (ESPN)
 Dallas Cowboys Cheerleaders: Making the Team (2006)
 Fame Asylum (2006)
 King of Cars (2006)
 Opening Soon
 An Amish Christmas (2005)
 The Real Housewives of Orange County (2006)
 Bullrun (2007)
 Deadline (2007)
 Ice Road Truckers (2007)
 Kate Plus 8 (2007)
 LA Ink (2007)
 Say Yes to the Dress (2007)
 Sex Change Hospital (2007)
 19 Kids and Counting (2008)
 Ax Men (2008)
 Chef School (2008)
 David Tutera's CELEBrations (2008)
 The Real Housewives of Atlanta (2008) 
 The Real Housewives of New York City (2008)
 BBQ Pitmasters (2009)
 Bondi Vet (2009)
 The Colony (2009) (US; Discovery)
 Full Throttle Saloon (2009) (US; TruTv)
 Jersey Shore (2009)
 Jockeys (2009) (US; Animal Planet)
 NYC Prep (2009)
 The Real Housewives of New Jersey (2009)
 Teen Mom (2009)
 Toddlers & Tiaras (2009)
 American Restoration (2010) (US)
 Boston Med (2010)
 Freshwater Blue (2010)
 The Generations Project (2010)
 Geordie Shore (2010) (UK)
 Half Pint Brawlers (2010)
 Jerseylicious (2010)
 Love & Hip Hop (2010)
 Bad Girls Club (2007) (US)
 Made in Chelsea (2010) (UK)
 Oddities (2010)
 The Only Way Is Essex (2010) (UK)
 The Real Housewives of Beverly Hills (2010)
 The Real Housewives of D.C. (2010)
 The Real L-Word: Los Angeles (2010)
 Say Yes to the Dress: Atlanta (2010)
 Sister Wives (2010)
 Throttle Junkies TV (2010)
 Bear Whisperer (2011) 
 Braxton Family Values (2011)
 Dance Moms (2011) 
 Me'usharot (2011) (Israel)
 Mob Wives (2011)
 My Transsexual Summer (2011)
 The Real Housewives of Athens (2011)
 The Real Housewives of Miami (2011)
 Say Yes to the Dress: Bridesmaids (2011)
 Say Yes to the Dress: Randy Knows Best (2011)
 Teen Mom 2 (2011)
 My Big Fat American Gypsy Wedding (2012)
 Breaking Amish (2012)
 Cheer Perfection (2012)
 Duck Dynasty (2012)
 Here Comes Honey Boo Boo (2012)
 NY Med (2012)
 Randy to the Rescue (2012)
 The Real Housewives of Vancouver (2012)
 Saw Dogs (2012)
 Turbine Cowboys (2012)
 Love & Hip Hop: Atlanta (2012)
 WAG Nation (2012) (Australia) 
 Gypsy Sisters (2013)Married to Medicine (2013)
 Below Deck (2013)
 Breaking Amish: Brave New World (2013)
 Fame in the Family (2013) (US)
 Fixer Upper (2013)
 Pretty Wicked Moms (2013)
 Les Vraies Housewives (2013) (France)
 Weed Country (2013)
 The Gossip Game (2013)
 Branson Famous (2014)
 Bring It! (2014)
 Chrisley Knows Best (2014)
 Escape Club (2014)
 Party Down South (2014)
 The Real Housewives of Melbourne (2014)
 Rich Kids of Beverly Hills (2014)
 Love & Hip Hop: Hollywood (2014)
 This Is Hot 97 (2014)
 3AM (2015)
 Boston EMS (2015)
 Breaking Greenville (2015)
 The Real Housewives of Cheshire (2015)
 Save My Life: Boston Trauma (2015)
 Bringing Up Bates (2015)
 WAGS (2015)
 Dash Dolls (2015)
 My Life As A College Student (2015–17)
 Suomen täydelliset venäläisnaiset (2015) (Finland)
 #BlackLove (2015)
 Below Deck Mediterranean (2016)
 Open Your Heart (2016)
 WAGS Miami (2016)Married to Medicine: Houston (2016)
 WAGS Atlanta (2017)
 Dr. Pimple Popper (2018)Married to Medicine: Los Angeles (2019)

Docusoaps starring celebrities
This genre, launched most successfully by music channel MTV, follows a camera crew into the lives of celebrities.
 This Is Your Life (1952) (US)
 The Anna Nicole Show (2002)
 The Osbournes (2002)
 Newlyweds: Nick and Jessica (2003)
 *NSYNC: The Best Life Ever (2003)
 Rich Girls (2003)
 The Simple Life (2003)
 Viva La Bam (2003)
 The Surreal Life (2003)
 The Ashlee Simpson Show (2004)
 Blow Out (2004) (US)
 The Gastineau Girls (2004)
 Growing Up Gotti (2004)
 The Simple Life 2 (2004)
 'Til Death Do Us Part: Carmen and Dave (2004)
 Being Bobby Brown (2005)
 Britney and Kevin: Chaotic (2005)
 Filthy Rich: Cattle Drive (2005)
 The Girls Next Door (2005)
 Hogan Knows Best (2005)
 I Married a Princess (2005)
 Kathy Griffin: My Life on the D-List (2005)
 Meet the Barkers (2005)
 My Fair Brady (2005)
 Run's House (2005)
 The Simple Life: Interns (2005)
 Tommy Lee Goes to College (2005)
 Totally Scott-Lee (2005) (UK)
 #1 Single (2006)
 Chantelle: Living the Dream (2006) (UK)
 Gene Simmons Family Jewels (2006)
 Girls Aloud: Off the Record (2006) (UK)
 House of Carters (2006)
 The Princes of Malibu (2006)
 Rob & Big (2006)
 Adventures in Hollyhood – Three Six Mafia (2006)
 The Hills (2006)
 The Janice Dickinson Modeling Agency (2006)
 Keeping Up with the Kardashians (2007)
 Kimora: Life in the Fab Lane (2007)
 Life of Ryan (2007)
 Snoop Dogg's Father Hood (2007)
 The City (2008)
 Flipping Out (2008)
 New York Goes to Hollywood (2008)
 The Rachel Zoe Project (2008)
 Kourtney and Kim Take Miami (2009)
 New York Goes to Work (2009)
 Brandy & Ray J: A Family Business (2010)
 Frank the Entertainer in a Basement Affair (2010)
 Real and Chance: The Legend Hunters (2010)
 Audrina (2011)
 Ice Loves Coco (2011)
 Khloé & Lamar (2011)
 Kourtney and Kim Take New York (2011)
 Son of a Gun (2011)
 Tia & Tamera (2011)
 Young Money Diaries (2011) 
 Brynne: My Bedazzled Life (2012) (Australia)
 Married to Jonas (2012)
 Mrs. Eastwood & Company (2012)
 Snooki & Jwoww (2012)
 Chrissy & Mr. Jones (2012)
 Cassadee Pope: Frame by Frame (2013)
 One Direction: The Best Life Ever (2013)
 Total Divas (2013)
 Vanderpump Rules (2013)
 Christina Milian Turned Up (2014)
 Kourtney and Khloé Take The Hamptons (2014)
 K. Michelle: My Life (2014)
 The Family Payne (2014) 
 Luke Hemmings Crossed His Heart (2015) 
 Jared & Miley (2015) 
 I Am Cait (2015)
 Stewarts & Hamiltons (2015)
 I Love Kellie Pickler (2015)
 Total Bellas (2016)
 Rob & Chyna (2016)
 Life of Kylie (2017)
 Miz & Mrs. (2018)
 Very Cavallari (2018)
 Crikey! It's the Irwins (2018)
 The Hills: New Beginnings (2019)
 Lindsay Lohan's Beach Club (2019)
 BossBabes (2019) (New Zealand)

 Financial transactions and appraisals 
 Antiques Roadshow (1997)
 Pawn Stars (2009) (US)
 Hardcore Pawn (2010) (US)
 American Pickers (2010) (North America)
 Auction Hunters (2010) (North America)

 Extraordinary people 
 Real People (1979)
 That's Incredible! (1980)

Structured reality
The Primetime Emmy Awards, which have given an award for Outstanding Structured Reality Program define structured reality shows as shows that "contain consistent story elements that mostly adhere to a recurring structured template."

 Ramsay's Kitchen Nightmares (2004)
 Dog Whisperer (2004)
 Dragons' Den (2005)
 Kitchen Nightmares (2007)
 Human Wrecking Balls (2008) (G4)
 Shark Tank (2009)
 Property Brothers (2011)

Historical re-creation
This genre takes modern-day contestants and puts them in the lifestyle of historical people or places.
 Living in the Past (TV series) (1978) (UK; BBC)
 The 1900 House (1999) (UK; PBS)
 Pioneer Quest: A Year in the Real West (2000) (Canada)
 The 1940s House (2001) (UK)
 The Edwardian Country House aka Manor House (2002)
 Frontier House (2002) (US; PBS)
 Lads' Army (2002, 2004, 2005, 2006) (UK)
 Quest for the Bay (2002) (Canada)
 Schwarzwaldhaus 1902 (Blackforest House 1902) (2002) (Germany)
 The Ship (2002) (UK)
 Klondike: The Quest for Gold (2003) (Canada)
 Le Moyen 1903 2003 (Switzerland/TSR)
 That'll Teach 'Em (2003, 2004, 2006) (UK)
 Warrior Challenge (2003) (US)
 Colonial House (2004) (US; PBS)
 Infamous (2004, E!)
 Regency House Party (2004) (UK)
 Windstärke 8 – Das Auswandererschiff 1855 (Windstrength 8 – Immigration Ship of 1855) (2004/2005) (Germany)
 The Colony (2005) (Australia)
 Die Harte Schule der 50er Jahre (The Hard School of the 1950s) (2005) (Germany)
 MTV's The 70s House (2005)
 Outback House (2005) (Australia)
 Tales from the Green Valley (2005) (UK)
 Coal House (2007) (UK)
 Kid Nation (2007) (US)
 Coal House At War (2008) (UK)
 Victorian Farm (2009) (UK)
 Edwardian Farm (2010) (UK)
 Over the Rainbow (2010)
 Turn Back Time – The High Street (2010) (UK)
 Victorian Pharmacy (2010) (UK)
 Turn Back Time – The Family (2012) (UK)
 Wartime Farm (2012) (UK)
 Tudor Monastery Farm (2013) (UK)
  Victorian slum  Back in time for Brixton  Back in time for the weekendDating
In this genre, couples or singles are brought together in dating or romantic situations.
 Boer soek 'n vrou (South-Africa)
 The Dating Game (1965)
 Punch de Date (パンチDEデート) (1973) (Japan)
 Love Connection (1983–1994, 1998–1999, 2017–2018)
 Neruton Benikujiradan (ねるとん紅鯨団) (1987) (Japan)
 Ainori (あいのり) (1999) (Japan)
 Blind Date (US) (1999)
 Who Wants to Marry a Multi-Millionaire? (2000)
 The 5th Wheel (2001)
 Chains of Love (2001)
 Dismissed (2001)
 Farmer Wants a Wife (2001) (UK)
 Five Go Dating (2001) (UK)
 Temptation Island (2001)
 Who Wants to Be a Princess (2001)
 The Bachelor (2002)
 The Bachelor (2003) (UK)
 The Bachelor Canada (Fall 2012)
 Bachelorettes in Alaska (2002)
 ElimiDATE (2002)
 Ex-treme Dating (2002)
 Meet My Folks (2002)
 Shipmates (2001)
 Streetmate (UK)
 Would Like to Meet (UK)
 Average Joe (2003)
 The Bachelorette (2003)
 Cupid (2003)
 For Love or Money (2003)
 Joe Millionaire (2003)
 Married by America (2003)
 Mr. Personality (2003)
 Paradise Hotel (2003)
 Room Raiders (2003)
 Three's a Crowd (2003) (UK)
 Boy Meets Boy (2004)
 Date My Mom (2004)
 The Littlest Groom (2004)
 My Big Fat Obnoxious Fiance (2004)
 Outback Jack (2004)
 The Player (2004)
 Playing It Straight (US – 2004, UK – 2005)
 The Ultimate Love Test (2004) (US)
 Who Wants to Marry My Dad? (2004)
 Celebrity Love Island (2005) (UK)
 How to Get Lucky (2005) (UK)
 Next (2005)
 Shopping for Love (2005) (Australia)
 Strange Love (2005)
 Beija Sapo (Brazil) (2005–2007)
 Vai dar Namoro (Brazil) (2005)
 12 Corazones (2006)
 Chantelle's Dream Dates (2006) (UK)
 Estoy por tí (Spain)
 Flavor of Love (2006)
 I Love New York (2007)
 Matched in Manhattan (2006)
 Parental Control (2006)
 Age of Love (2007)
 MTV Splitsvilla (2007) (India)
 Rock of Love with Bret Michaels (2007)
 A Shot at Love with Tila Tequila (2007)
 Momma's Boys (2008)
 Real Chance of Love (2008)
 Tough Love (2008)
 Transamerican Love Story (2008)
 When Spicy Meets Sweet (2008)
 Daisy of Love (2009)
 Dating in the Dark (2009)
 For the Love of Ray J (2009)
 Iron brides (2009)
 Megan Wants a Millionaire (2009)
 More to Love (2009)
 Bachelor Pad (2010)
 [V] Lovenet (2010)
 Seducing Cindy (2010)
 Excused (2011)
 Bachelor in Paradise (2014)
 Are You the One? (2014)
 Ex on the Beach (2014) (UK)
 I Wanna Marry "Harry" (2014)
 Married at First Sight (American TV series) (2014)
 Love Island (2015) (UK)
 Love Avatars (脫獨工程) (2016) (Hong Kong)
 Ex on the Beach (2018) (US)
 Love Island (2019) (US)
 Love Is Blind (2020)
 The Bachelor Presents: Listen to Your Heart (2020)
 Too Hot to Handle (2020)
 Love Staycation (戀愛Staycation) (2022) (Hong Kong)
 International Markets for Sisters (姊妹們的國際市場) (2022) (Hong Kong)

Makeover
This increasingly popular genre features ordinary people having home or lifestyle makeovers with the assistance of professionals.
 This Old House (1979) (USA)
 Changing Rooms (1996) (UK) = Trading Spaces (US) (2000)
 Mitre 10 Dream Home (1999) (New Zealand)
 Backyard Blitz (Australia) (2000)
 A Makeover Story (US) (2000)
 What Not to Wear (2001) (UK)
 What Not to Wear (US)
 The Block (2002) (Australia)
 Extreme Makeover (2002)
 Life Laundry (2002) (UK; house clearance)
 MTV's Made (2002)
 Monster Garage (2002) (US)
 Clean House (2003)
 Clean Sweep (2003)
 Extreme Makeover: Home Edition (2003)
 How Clean Is Your House? (2003) (UK)
 Knock First (2003)
 Monster House (2003) (US)
 Queer Eye for the Straight Guy (2003)
 Restoration (2003) (UK)
 Born Diva (Philippines) (2004)
 The Complex: Malibu (2004) (US)
 Dr. 90210 (2004) (US)
 Pimp My Ride (2004) (MTV, US)
 Style By Jury (Canada) (2004)
 The Swan (2004) (US)
 Town Haul (2004) (TLC, US)
 Trading Spaces: Home Free (2004)
 Queer Eye for the Straight Girl (2005) (US)
 Trinny & Susannah Undress (UK) (2006)
 Extreme Weight Loss (2011)
 The Renovators (Australia) (2011)
 Hotel Impossible (2012) (US)
 Botched (2014)
 DIY Rescue (Australia) 
 The Hothouse (Australia)
 Location Location (Australia)
 Relationship Rehab (Style Network, US)
 Renovation Rescue (Australia)
 Trinny & Susannah Make Over America (US)

Lifestyle change
Here, ordinary people experience an extraordinary change in their environments or occupations.
 Girl Friday (1994) (UK)
 Castaway 2000 (2000) (UK)
 Supersize vs Superskinny (2000) (UK)
 Shipwrecked (2000) (UK)
 Faking It (2001) (UK; remade in US in 2003)
 Celebrity Fit Club (2002) (UK)
 Wife Swap (2002) (2003) (UK)
 Holiday Swap (2003) (UK)
 Masters and Servants (2003) (UK)
 The Biggest Loser (2004) (US)
 He's a Lady (2004) (US)
 Holiday Showdown (2004) (UK)
 My Restaurant Rules (2004) (Australia)
 Nanny 911 (2004)
 The Resort (2004) (Australia)
 Supernanny (2004 UK, 2005 US)
 Trading Spouses (2004) (US)
 What the Butler Saw (2004) (UK)
 30 Days (2005)
 Australian Princess (Australia) (2005)
 Brat Camp (2005)
 Extreme Celebrity Detox (2005) (UK)
 FC Zulu (2005-7, Denmark) – format FC Nerds also made in Sweden (FCZ), Norway (Tufte IL), Finland (FC Nörtit), Netherlands (Atletico Ananas), Germany (Borussia Banana), Australia (Nerds FC), Belgium and Spain
 Ladette to Lady (2005) (UK)
 The Monastery (2005) (UK)
 The Convent (2006) (UK)
 Shalom in the Home (2006-2007) (US)
 Trust Me – I’m A Holiday Rep (2005) (UK)
 The Bad Girls Club (2006)
 Boys will be Girls (2006) (UK)
 Survival of the Richest (2006)
 Fat March (2007) (US)
 Charm School Flavor of Love Girls: Charm School (2007) (US)
 Rock of Love: Charm School (2008) (US)
 Charm School with Ricki Lake (2009) (US)
 Hoarders (2009) (US)
 Tool Academy (2009) (US)
 The Great Norwegian Adventure (2010–2011) (Norway)
 Jamie Oliver's Food Revolution (2010–2011)
 Intervention (US)
 Marriage Boot Camp (2013)
 The Reality of Anger Management (2014) (US)
 Love is in the Heir (2004)

Fantasies fulfilled
 Aswamedham (India)
 Thrill of a Lifetime (1982–88 & 2002) (Canada & USA)
 Wish Ko Lang (2002) (Philippines)
 Are You Hot? (2003)
 No Opportunity Wasted (2004)
 Your Reality Checked (2004)
 Let's Get This Party Started (2005) (US)
 Three Wishes (2005) (US)
 Simpleng Hiling (Philippines)
 Willingly Yours (Philippines)
 Điều ước thứ 7 (2014) (Vietnam)

Video cameras/hidden camera
This is perhaps the oldest reality show genre, popular as far back as the early days of television.
 Candid Camera (1948)
 Dokkiri Camera (どっきりカメラ) (1970) (Japan)
 Star Dokkiri Maruhi Hōkoku (スターどっきり（秘）報告) (1976) (Japan)
 Foul-Ups, Bleeps & Blunders (1984)
 TV's Bloopers & Practical Jokes (1984)
 Beadle's About (1987) (UK)
 America's Funniest Home Videos (1989)
 America's Funniest People (1990)
 Tim Conway's Funny America (1990)
 Totally Hidden Video (1991)
 Impractical Jokers I Witness Video (1992)
 World's Funniest Videos (1996)
 Real TV (1996)
 The World's Funniest! (1997)
 World's Most Amazing Videos (1998)
 Cheaters (2000)
 Funny Flubs & Screw-Ups (2000)
 Maximum Exposure (2000)
 Trigger Happy TV (2000) (UK; launched comedian Dom Joly)
 Qué Locura (2001)
 Spy TV (2001)
 The Jamie Kennedy Experiment (2002)
 Oblivious (2002)
 Girls Behaving Badly (2003?)
 Punk'd (2003)
 Scare Tactics (2003)
 Victim (2004) (Philippines)
 Celebrity Stitch Up (2005) (UK)
 Fire Me...Please (2005)
 Hi-Jinks (2005)
 Boiling Points (US) MTV
 Just for Laughs: Gags (Canada)
 Help Me (Minta Tolong) (Indonesia)
 Laugh Out Loud (LOL) (Philippines)
 What Would You Do? (2008) (United States)
 Utopia (2014) (United States)

Reality game shows/reality "playoffs"main article: Reality game showThis, the biggest and most successful reality genre, features contestants who compete for prizes, while often living together in close quarters. They usually feature the elimination of contestants until a winner is chosen. Sometimes they are considered to be "reality playoffs" since their format is similar to that of a playoff in sports.

 Beat the Clock (1950)
 Truth or Consequences (1950)
 Fort Boyard (1990) (France)
 Susume! Denpa Shōnen (進め!電波少年) (1992) (Japan)
 How Do You Like Wednesday? (水曜どうでしょう) (1996) (Japan)
 Expedition Robinson (1997)
 Shiawase Kazoku Keikaku (しあわせ家族計画) (1997) (Japan)
 The Challenge (formerly known as Real World/Road Rules Challenge) (1998)
 Susunu! Denpa Shōnen (進ぬ!電波少年) (1998–2002) (Japan)
 Big Brother (1999) (many countries)
 Who Wants to Be a Millionaire? (1999) (many countries)
 Big Brother (2000) (UK)
 Big Brother (2000) (US)
 Celebrity Big Brother (UK)
 The Mole (2000)
 Survivor (2000)
 No Limite (2000) (Brazil)
 The Amazing Race (2001)
 Boot Camp (2001)
 Cannonball Run 2001 (2001)
 Dog Eat Dog (2001) (UK)
 Fear Factor (2001)
 Lost (2001)
 Moolah Beach (2001)
 Murder in Small Town X (2001)
 Pilipinas, Game KNB? (2001) (dubbed as "the best Philippine game show")
 100 Hours (2002) (New Zealand)
 Beg, Borrow & Deal (2002–2003)
 Big Brother (2002) (Brazil)
 Endurance (2002) (US)
 I'm a Celebrity... Get Me Out of Here! (2002) (UK)
 I'm a Celebrity... US version (US)
 Model Flat (Fashion TV, 2002)
 Under One Roof (2002)
 Dog Eat Dog (2003) (US)
 Drop the Celebrity (2003) (UK)
 Celebrity Farm (2003)
 The Games (2003) (UK)
 Going Straight (2003) (New Zealand)
 Paradise Hotel (2003)
 Való Világ (2003) (Hungary)
 The Apprentice (2004)
 Back To Reality (2004) (UK)
 The Benefactor (2004)
 The Code Room (2004)
 The Farm (2004) (UK)
 Forever Eden (2004)
 Gana la Verde (2004) (US; Spanish language)
 I'm Famous and Frightened! (2004) (UK)
 Mad Mad House (2004)
 Peking Express (2004) (BEL/NED)
 Quest USA (2004) (US)
 Shattered (2004) (UK)
 Strictly Come Dancing (2004) (UK)
 Actuality TV's Casting Call (2005) (US)
 Beauty and the Geek (2005)
 Infinite Challenge (2005) (Korea)
 Pinoy Big Brother (2005) (Philippines)
 Vyvolení (2005) (Czech Republic, Slovakia)
 Deal or No Deal (2006) (many countries)
 Shipwrecked: Battle of the Islands (2006) (UK)
 Solitary (2006) (US)
 Treasure Hunters (2006) (US)
 Ultimate Challenge (2006) (Pakistan's first adventure-based reality show)
 Unan1mous (2006) (US)
 Are You Smarter Than a 5th Grader? (2007) (many countries)
 Britain's Got Talent (2007) (UK)
 Crowned: The Mother of All Pageants (2007) (US)
 Pirate Master (2007) (US)
 Celebrity Apprentice (2008)
 I Love Money (2008)
 I Survived a Japanese Game Show (2008) (US)
 Wipeout (2008) (US)
 13: Fear Is Real (2009) (US)
 A Fazenda (2009) (Brazil)
 The Great American Road Trip (2009) (US)
 Busão do Brasil (2010) (Brazil)
 Minute to Win It (2010) (US)
 Spring Break Challenge (2010, US)
 Storage Wars (2010, US)
 Expedition Impossible (2011) (US)
 The Glass House (2012)
 Celebrity Splash! (2012) (many countries)
 Redneck Island (2012)
 Shipping Wars (2012, US)
 The Genius (2013) (Korea)
 Hollywood Game Night (2013) (US)
 King of the Nerds (2013) (US)
 Whodunnit? (2013) (US)
 Capture (2013) (US)
 The Quest (2014) (US)
 Steve Austin's Broken Skull Challenge (2014)
 Hunted (2015, UK) (2017, US)
 I Survived a Zombie Apocalypse (2015) (UK)
 Home Free (2015) (US)
 American Grit (2016)
 Escape the Night (2016)
 Power Couple (2016) (Brazil)
 A Casa (2017) (Brazil)
 Bromans (2017) (UK)
 Battle of the Ex Besties (2017) (US)
 The Challenge: Champs vs. Pros (2017) (US)
 The Challenge: Champs vs. Stars (2017) (US)
 The Cuts Indonesia (2017) (Indonesia)
 Celebrity Big Brother (2017) (US)
 The Circle (2018) (UK)
 The Heist (2018-2020) (UK)
 The Circle (2020) (US)
 The Circle (2020) (Brazil)
 Around Naija (2021) (Nigeria)
 Ilha Record (2021) (Brazil)

Talent searches
Often similar to the game show genre in that there are eliminations and a final winner, this genre centers on contestants competing a specific skill or talent, rather than in random challenges.

Before 2000
 Arthur Godfrey's Talent Scouts (1948)
 Original Amateur Hour (1948)
 Opportunity Knocks (1956) (UK)
 Star Tanjō! (スター誕生!) (1971) (Japan)
 The Gong Show (1976)
 Owarai Star Tanjō! (お笑いスター誕生!!) (1980) (Japan)
 Star Search (1980s)
 Stars in Their Eyes (1990) (UK)
 Asayan (1995) (Japan)
 Popstars (New Zealand) (1999) (UK version bands Hear'Say and Liberty X)

2000s premieres
 Search for a Supermodel (Australia) (2000)
 Bands on the Run (2001)
 Operación Triunfo (2001) (Spain)
 Idol Pop Idol (2001–2003) (UK)
 American Idol (2002)
 American Juniors (2003)
 Canadian Idol (2002)
 Australian Idol (2003)
 Philippine Idol (2006)
 Pinoy Idol (2008)
 Model Behaviour (2001–2002) (UK)
 WWE Tough Enough WWF/WWE Tough Enough (2001)
 WWE Tough Enough 2 (2002)
 WWE Tough Enough 3 (2003)
 La Academia (2002) (Mexico)
 Fame Academy (2002) (2003) (UK)
 Popstars: The Rivals (2002) (UK)
 Worst Driver (franchise) Britain's Worst Driver (2002)
 Canada's Worst Driver (2005)
 America's Worst Driver (2010)
 Top Model America's Next Top Model (2003)
 Canada's Next Top Model Britain's Next Top Model Australia's Next Top Model Top Model GhanaBe a Grand Prix Driver (2003) (UK)
 Comic Relief does Fame Academy (2003) (2005) (2007)
 Last Comic Standing (2003)
 Nashville Star (2003)Performing As... (2003)
 Reborn in the USA (2003) (UK)
 Search for the Star in a Million (2003) (Philippines) ABS-CBN
 Star Académie (2003) (France)
 StarStruck (2003) (Philippines)
 Surf Girls (2003)
 WWE Diva Search (2003) (US)
 The Apprentice (2004–2007, US, NBC)
 The Assistant (2004)Bollywood Star (2004) (UK)Can You Be a Porn Star? (2004)
 The Contender (2004)
 Dancing with the Stars (2004) (many countries)
 Dancing with the Stars (US) (2005)
 Dancing with the Stars: Juniors (US) (2018)
 Dream Job (2004)
 Dream Job II (2004)
 Get Gorgeous (2004) (India)
 Hell's Kitchen (2004 – UK, 2005 – US)
 Kings of Comedy (2004) (UK)
 Little Big Star (2005) (Philippines)
 Megasztár (2004) (2005) (2006) (Hungary)
 Next Action Star (2004)
 The Next Great Champ (2004)
 Pinoy Pop Superstar (2004) (Philippines)
 Popstars Live (2004) (Australia)
 Project Runway (2004) (US)
 The Rebel Billionaire: Branson's Quest for the Best (2004)
 Star Circle Quest (2004) (Philippines)
 Strictly Come Dancing (2004) (UK)
 Super Singer (2004) (India)Wickedly Perfect (2004) (US)
 The X Factor (2004) (UK)
 Afghan Star (2005) (Afghanistan)
 Britain's Worst Celebrity Driver (2005) (UK)
 Celebrity Wrestling (2005) (UK)
 Filmstjerne (2005) (Norway)
 Football Icon (2005) (UK)
 Get Gorgeous II (2005) (India)
 Hit Me Baby One More Time (2005) (UK)
 Launchpad (2005) (India)
 The Next Food Network Star (2005)
 Rock Star INXS (2005)
 The Scholar (2005)
 So You Think You Can Dance (2005) (many countries)
 So You Think You Can Dance (US) (2005)
 Strictly Dance Fever (2005) (UK)
 The Ultimate Fighter (2005, USA, Spike)
 The All Star Talent Show (2006) (UK)
 American Inventor (2006) (ABC)
 Dancing on Ice (2006) (UK)
 Dirty Dancing (2006)
 Just the Two of Us (2006) (UK)
 Knight School (2006, USA, ESPN)
 The One: Making a Music Star (2006)
 Pinoy Dream Academy (2006) (Philippines)
 Rock Star: Supernova (2006)
 Skating With Celebrities (2006) (US)
 Soapstar Superstar (2006) (UK)
 Top Chef (franchise) Top Chef (2006) (US)
 The Ultimate Coyote Ugly Search (2006) (US)
 Who Wants to be a Superhero? (2006) (Sci-fi)
 America's Most Smartest Model (2007, US)
 Don't Forget the Lyrics! (2007) (many countries)
 Ego Trip's The "White" Rapper Show (2007)
 Grease: You're the One that I Want! (2007)
 The Next Iron Chef (2007, US, Food Network)
 Phenomenon (2007, US, NBC)
 Pussycat Dolls Present 
 Pussycat Dolls Present: The Search for the Next Doll (2007)
 Pussycat Dolls Present: Girlicious (2008)
 The Shot (2007, US)
 The Singing Bee (2007) (US)
 America's Best Dance Crew (2008, US)
 Celebrity Bainisteoir (2008, Ireland)
 Ego Trip's Miss Rap Supreme (2008)
 Fáilte Towers (2008, Ireland)
 High School Musical: Get in the Picture (2008)
 I Know My Kid's a Star (2008)
 My Kid's a Star (2008)
 Redemption Song (2008)
 Scream Queens (2008)
 African Inventors & Innovators TV Program (2009–2014) (Nigeria)
 Chopped (TV series) (2009) (US)
 Local Live (2009) (Canada)
 MasterChef Australia (2009) (Australia)
 RuPaul's Drag Race (2009)
 Super Star K (2009) (Korea)

2010s premieres
 Bridalplasty (2010)
 Just Dance (2010) (India)
 MasterChef (2010)
 Parovi (2010) (Serbia)
 Skating with the Stars (2010)
 Star Anchor Hunt (2010) (India)
 Top Shot (2010) (North America)
 America's Best Dance Crew (2011) (North America)
 Face Off (2011) (US)
 The Glee Project (2011)
 Live to Dance (2011) (North America)
 Project Accessory (2011)
 The Voice (many countries) (2010)
 The Voice (2011) (US)
 The X Factor (2011) (North America)
 Project Runway: All Stars (2012)
 TNA British Boot Camp (2013) (United Kingdom)
 MasterChef Junior (2013)
 The Face (2013)
 Can You Beat the Professor (2014) (US)
 Idea to Industry (2014) (Nigeria)
 Real Country (TV series) (2018, US)
 Project Runway: Threads (2014)
 Royco Fuata Flava (2014) (Kenya)
 Skin Wars (2014)
 The Great British Baking Show(2014)
 Under the Gunn (2014)
 Forged in Fire (2015) (US)
 Nach Baliye 7 (2015) (India)
 WWE Tough Enough (2015)
 Jhalak Dikhhla Jaa Reloaded (2015) (India)
 Dance Plus (2015) (India)
 D3 – D 4 Dance (2016) (India)
 Tarok got talents, (first edition winner, Sticky ya Bongtur) (2016) (Nigeria)
YWT 01 – YOUTH WITH TALENT (2016) (Sri Lanka)
 DZ Comedy Show (2017) (Algeria)
 World of Dance (2017)
YWT 02 – YOUTH WITH TALENT (2017) (Sri Lanka)
 Making It (2018)
 The Masked Singer (2018)
 Songland (2019)
 Hyperdrive (2019)
 King Maker IV (2021) (Hong Kong)

Hoax shows
Reality shows in which one or more participants are tricked into believing they are taking part in a legitimate show when they are actually the victim(s) of a joke. These types of shows are somewhat akin to hidden camera shows.
 The Joe Schmo Show (2003)
 $25 Million Dollar Hoax (2004)
 Faking the Video (2004)
 Joe Schmo 2 (2004)
 My Big Fat Obnoxious Boss (2004)
 My Big Fat Obnoxious Fiance (2004)
 Superstar USA (2004)
 There's Something About Miriam (2004)
 Invasion Iowa (2005)
 Space Cadets (2005) (UK)
 Monster House (2008) (Australia)

See also
 List of television show franchises

References

External links
 13 Reality Shows We Really Wish We Were Making Up

Reality